Adam Smalley (born 2 January 2001 in Poulton-le-Fylde, England) is a British racing driver currently competing in the 2022 Porsche Carrera Cup Great Britain for Duckhams Yuasa Racing.

Making his car racing debut in 2017, Smalley has won the title in 3 of the 4 categories he has raced in, and won the 2022-2023 Porsche Carrera Cup GB Junior Driver Award in November 2021, succeeding Harry King. He is a member of the Motorsport UK Academy.

Career

Karting
Born in 2001 in Poulton-le-Fylde, Smalley made his karting debut in 2011 at the Trent Valley Kart Club, aged 10. Throughout his 6 year karting campaign, he won titles such as the MSA E Plate Rotax Junior series, and the 2016 Rotax Max Wintercup in the Rotax Max Junior class, beating drivers such as FIA F3 driver László Tóth.

Ginetta Junior Championship
Smalley made his car racing debut in the 2017 Ginetta Junior Championship, racing with JHR Developments. In this year he would finish 7th in the standings, with a podium and a fastest lap. At the end of the year, he would compete in the Winter Series at Brands Hatch, winning the title with 2 wins and 4 podiums in the 4 races.

Adam would continue in the series in 2018, this time switching teams to Elite Motorsport. He would dominate this year, winning 8 races and picking up 9 pole positions to win the title by 8 points.

Ginetta GT5 Challenge
In 2019, he would move up to the Ginetta GT5 Challenge, again with Elite Motorsport. Winning two of the three races during the first round at Oulton Park, and would continue through the season with two further wins and 10 podiums, to finish 2nd in the standings, 49 points behind champion Scott McKenna.

Ginetta GT4 Supercup
In 2020, Smalley would switch to the Ginetta GT4 Supercup, competing with Elite Motorsport. With 4 wins, he would finish 4th in the standings with 462 points.

He would continue in the championship in 2021, again with Elite Motorsport. Winning 7 races and picking up 13 podiums, he would win the title by 51 points.

Porsche Carrera Cup Great Britain
In November 2021, it was announced that Adam Smalley was the 2022-2023 Porsche Carrera Cup GB Junior Driver, following a shootout day earlier in the month. Succeeding Harry King, he made his debut in the series in 2022, driving for Duckhams Yuasa Racing.

Porsche Supercup
Smalley raced in the Silverstone round of the 2022 Porsche Supercup as a guest driver, driving for Duckhams Yuasa Racing with CLRT, where he finished 12th.

Karting Record

Karting career summary

Racing record

Racing career summary 

† As Smalley was a guest driver, he was ineligible for championship points.

Complete Ginetta GT4 Supercup results
(key) (Races in bold indicate pole position) (Races in italics indicate fastest lap)

References

External links
 

Sportspeople from Lancashire
English racing drivers
People from Poulton-le-Fylde
2001 births
Living people
Ginetta Junior Championship drivers
Ginetta GT4 Supercup drivers
Porsche Carrera Cup GB drivers
Porsche Supercup drivers
JHR Developments drivers